Eduard Rachikovich Sarkisov (born 5 April 1971) is a Russian professional football coach and a former player who is the manager of FC Kuban-Holding Pavlovskaya.

International career
While being a Russian citizen, Sarkisov was a prospect to join the Armenia national football team.

Personal life
In 1999 Sarkisov was married, and in summer of 1994, he had a son, Eduard. His wife and son also live in Novorossiysk.

External links
 
 Ukrainskyi futbol. 20 April 1999 (PDF, in Ukrainian)

1971 births
People from Novorossiysk
Sportspeople from Krasnodar Krai
Living people
Russian people of Armenian descent
Armenian footballers
Soviet footballers
Russian footballers
Association football midfielders
Russian expatriate footballers
Expatriate footballers in Ukraine
Russian expatriate sportspeople in Ukraine
Russian Premier League players
Ukrainian Premier League players
FC Chernomorets Novorossiysk players
FC Ararat Yerevan players
FC Kuban Krasnodar players
FC Spartak Ivano-Frankivsk players
FC Zhemchuzhina Sochi players
Russian football managers
FC Chernomorets Novorossiysk managers